Wychnor is a civil parish in the district of East Staffordshire, Staffordshire, England.  It contains 15 buildings that are recorded in the National Heritage List for England.  Of these, one is listed at Grade II*, the middle grade, and the others are at Grade II, the lowest grade.  The parish contains the village of Wychnor and the surrounding countryside. The Trent and Mersey Canal passes through the parish and the listed buildings associated with it are two bridges and a milepost.  The other listed buildings include a church, a country house and associated structures, farmhouses, and farm buildings.


Key

Buildings

References

Citations

Sources

Lists of listed buildings in Staffordshire